The Jordan-Elbridge Central School District consists of two different villages, Jordan and Elbridge both of which are in Onondaga County, New York which is located in Central New York, US.  The population as of 2010 according to the U.S. Census Bureau is: the Jordan village total population, 1,368 people; the Elbridge village total population, 1,058 people; and Town of Elbridge, in Onondaga County, New York, total population 5,922 people (as of 2010 Census).

Elbridge Elementary 
Elbridge Elementary is home to Universal Pre-Kindergarten-4th graders.

Ramsdell Elementary 
Ramsdell Elementary was originally 3-5th until the Fall of 2012 the new school year. When they had a low number of enroll mean of Students.

Ramsdell Middle School 
As of September 2012 to present. Ramsdell Middle School holds 5-8th grades.

Jordan-Elbridge High School 
Jordan-Elbridge High School teaches the 9th to 12th grades.

Address 

The Jordan-Elbridge School District is located in Onondaga County. Jordan-Elbridge Elementary (UPK-3) Address is "130 East Main Street, P.O. Box 170 Elbridge, NY 13060", "Jordan-Elbridge Ramsdell Middle School (4-8) Address is 9 North Chappell Street, P.O. Box 1150 Jordan, NY 13080" & "High School (9-12) Address is 5721 Hamilton Road, P.O. Box 901 Jordan, NY 13080"

References 
 Jordan-Elbridge Great School Ratings
 Jordan-Elbridge Central School District's Official Web Site
 Capital Project Pictures 2008-2012
 Census 2010

External links 
 Elbridge Elementary UPK-3 Web Site Link
 Ramsdell Middle School (4-8) Web Site Link
 Jordan Elbridge High School (9-12)Web Site Link

Education in Onondaga County, New York
School districts in New York (state)
School districts established in 1961